The 7th Lo Nuestro Awards ceremony, presented by the Univision, honored the best Latin music of 1994 and 1995 and took place on May 18, 1995, at a live presentation held in Miami, Florida. The ceremony was broadcast in the United States and Latin America by Univision.

During the ceremony, nineteen categories were presented. Winners were announced at the live event and included Tejano singer Selena receiving four posthumous awards, and Luis Miguel and Carlos Vives, each receiving two awards. Among its honors, Miguel won the award for "Pop Album of the Year," Selena for "Regional Mexican Album of the Year," and Olga Tañón won the award for "Tropical/Salsa Album of the Year." Spanish singer Julio Iglesias received the Excellence Award.

Background 
In 1989, the Lo Nuestro Awards were established by Univision, to recognize the most talented performers of Latin music. The nominees were selected by Univision and the winners chosen by the public. The categories included are for the Pop, Tropical/Salsa, Regional Mexican and Rap genres, and Music Video. The trophy awarded is shaped like a treble clef. The 7th Lo Nuestro Award ceremony was held on May 18, 1995, in a live presentation broadcast in United States and Latin America by Univision.

Winners and nominees 

Winners were announced before the live audience during the ceremony. Mexican singer-songwriter Juan Gabriel was the most nominated performer, with five nominations, including Pop Album (Gracias Por Esperar), Male Artist, Pop Song (for writing "Mañana", performed by Cristian Castro; "Luna", performed by Ana Gabriel; and "Pero Qué Necesidad", performed by Gabriel); the singer-songwriter received the Pop Song of the Year Award for his single "Pero Qué Necesidad". Mexican singer Luis Miguel was awarded for second year in row for Pop Album of the Year (Segundo Romance) and Pop Male Artist, and also won Video of the Year for "La Media Vuelta". Four of the songs nominated for Pop Song of the Year, Miguel's "El Día Que Me Quieras", "Luna" by Ana Gabriel, "Pero Que Necesidad" by Juan Gabriel, and La Mafia's "Vida", reached number-one at the Billboard Top Latin Songs chart. Tejano singer Selena dominated the Regional Mexican field winning all her nominations, including Album of the Year (Amor Prohibido), Regional Mexican Song ("Amor Prohibido") and Female Artist of the Year; Selena also won for Pop Female Artist. Puerto-Rican American artist Olga Tañón received two awards for Tropical/Salsa Album and Female Artist of the Year; while Colombian singer Carlos Vives was awarded for New Artist, Male Artist and Song of the Year for "La Gota Fría". Spanish singer Julio Iglesias earned the Excellence Award.

See also
1994 in Latin music

References

1995 music awards
Lo Nuestro Awards by year
1995 in Florida
1995 in Latin music
1990s in Miami